Nikhil Prem (born 4 August 1999) is a South African cricketer. He made his first-class debut for KwaZulu-Natal in the 2018–19 CSA 3-Day Provincial Cup on 21 February 2019. He made his List A debut for KwaZulu-Natal in the 2018–19 CSA Provincial One-Day Challenge on 24 February 2019.

References

External links
 

1999 births
Living people
South African cricketers
KwaZulu-Natal cricketers
Place of birth missing (living people)